Sidney Onoriode Esiri (born 1 May 1980), commonly known as Dr SID, is a Nigerian singer.

Early life 
Dr SID is from Delta State, he was born and raised in Lagos. His mother is a fashion designer and his father, Justus Esiri, is an actor. His father was a Member of the Order of the Niger (MON) and is known for his role as the Village Headmaster a Nigerian sitcom popular in the 1980s. The second child of four children, from an early age Dr SID had his heart set on becoming an entertainer. However, his life took a different course graduating from the Nigerian Air force Secondary school ikeja, SID went on to the University of Ibadan, Ibadan (UI) to study Dentistry and Dental Surgery. During his school years, his flair for entertainment was not hidden as he took part in school plays, dance competitions, and concerts winning numerous awards along the way.

Career

1999 
Dr SID signed on to a fresh new record label Trybe Records (who released the Nigerian hip hop group Trybesmen) as a choreographer. He would spend the next three years touring as a backup dancer for the Trybesmen.

2002 
Dr SID got his chance in front of the mic, when he was made a member of Da Trybe, and given a spot on the song that caused a revolution in Nigerian Hip-hop, "OYA" in 2002 alongside Sasha, 2-Shotz, Timi, DEL, and the Trybesmen (Eldee, Kb and Freestyle). Over the next year SID recorded his Debut Single "Don't Stop" and had the number 1 video on the MBI top ten for 8 weeks, His music career had to be put on hold as he had to take a year out to finish up his university degree.

2004 
Dr SID became a qualified Dentist. He moved to the UK working with the likes of JJC & the 419 squad, Felix Duke, KAS, R70, D'prince, D'Banj. Returning to Nigeria he spent the Next year working at Lagos University Teaching Hospital, and then went on to serve his country at Yola in Adamawa state. He also worked at various dental clinics combining dentistry and music.

2005 
He started recording a studio album titled Prognosis which featured the single "Raise da roof". He was nominated in the Best New Act category at the 2005 Amen Awards. He abandoned the album in 2006.

2007 
Dr SID quit practicing as a dentist after 3 years and decided to concentrate fully on his music career signing on to Don Jazzy's Mo' Hits Records and records the Mo' Hits Allstars collective album Curriculum Vitae (CV) which was released in December 2007. He featured on 7 of the 15 tracks released on the album, which include "Booty Call" and "Close to you".

2008 
Dr SID spent most of 2008 touring with the Mo Hits Allstars, and performing at some of the major concerts, including the Thisday Music Festival and Star Mega Jam.

2009 
Dr SID started recording his first studio album as a solo artist under Mo' Hits Records with producer Don Jazzy. The first single of the album Turning Point was titled "Something About You" and was released in September 2009 and is currently moving up the African charts alongside two other Winchi Winchi ft Wande Coal and Pop Something ft D'banj. He also performed at the MTV Africa Music Awards in Kenya as a member of the Mo' Hits Allstars alongside D'banj, Wande Coal and Kenyan artist STL.

2010–2011 
Mo' Hits Records release Dr SID's debut album Turning Point on 11 April
Dr SID New Single off Turning Point, "Over the Moon", hits number 1 on Nigerian top 10.

2012 

Following a fall out of the partners at Mo' Hits Records, D'banj and Don Jazzy, Dr SID has since signed on to Don Jazzy's Mavin Records. He also had three songs from his upcoming album featured on a Mavin Records compilation album titled: Solar Plexus.

2013 

Dr Sid released his sophomore album titled Siduction on December 20, 2013. The album featured guest appearances from Tiwa Savage, Ice Prince, Emma Nyra, Alexandra Burke, Phyno and Wizkid. The album had song production from Baby Fresh, Don Jazzy and BlayzeBeats.

2014 
Dr. Sid starred in Moses Inwang's 'The Last 3 Digits'. He starred an NYSC corp member and a friend to Nonso Diobi in the film. It won the People's Film Festival's Best International Film award in Paris, France.
Dr Sid performed his hit single Surulere Live on the MTV Africa Music award stage in Durban.

Discography

Studio albums 
2010  Turning Point
2013 Siduction

Singles

As featured artist on compilation albums 
2004: The Big Picture
2007: Curriculum Vitae
2012: Solar Plexus

Videography

Awards and nominations

Filmography

See also 
 Afrobeat
 African hip hop
 Nigerian hip hop
 Lagos

References

External links 
 Official website

Nigerian songwriters
Nigerian male rappers
Living people
Nigerian hip hop singers
1980 births
University of Ibadan alumni
21st-century Nigerian musicians
The Headies winners
Musicians from Lagos
Musicians from Delta State
English-language singers from Nigeria
Yoruba-language singers
21st-century male musicians